Iain Smythe (born June 2, 1985) is a Canadian male field hockey player, who played for the Canada national field hockey team at the 2015 Pan American Games and won a silver medal.

In 2016, he was named to Canada's Olympic team.

References

External links
 
 
 
 
 

1985 births
Living people
Canadian male field hockey players
Male field hockey forwards
Field hockey players at the 2011 Pan American Games
Field hockey players at the 2015 Pan American Games
Field hockey players at the 2019 Pan American Games
Field hockey players at the 2016 Summer Olympics
2018 Men's Hockey World Cup players
Olympic field hockey players of Canada
Pan American Games silver medalists for Canada
Field hockey players from Vancouver
Pan American Games medalists in field hockey
Medalists at the 2011 Pan American Games
Medalists at the 2015 Pan American Games
Medalists at the 2019 Pan American Games